Langhorne Historic District, also known as "Attleborough," is a national historic district located in Langhorne, Bucks County, Pennsylvania.  The district includes 252 contributing buildings and 1 contributing site in the borough of Langhorne. It is a principally residential district with dwellings representative of the vernacular Federal, Late Victorian, and Bungalow/craftsman styles.  They were built between 1738 and 1937, with the majority constructed between 1850 and 1937. The residences are characterized as 2 1/2-story, stone or frame structures. Notable buildings include the Jonathan Stackhouse Home (1830), Allen Mitchell Residence (1868), Rachel Shaw Residence (1870), Henry Lovett House (1891), and Middleton Monthly Meetinghouse (1793).  Located in the district and separately listed are the Langhorne Library, Joseph Richardson House, and Tomlinson-Huddleston House.

It was added to the National Register of Historic Places in 1986.

References

External links

Historic districts in Bucks County, Pennsylvania
Federal architecture in Pennsylvania
Victorian architecture in Pennsylvania
Historic districts on the National Register of Historic Places in Pennsylvania
National Register of Historic Places in Bucks County, Pennsylvania